Thiazide refers to both a class of sulfur-containing organic molecules and a class of diuretics based on the chemical structure of benzothiadiazine. The thiazide drug class was discovered and developed at Merck and Co. in the 1950s. The first approved drug of this class, chlorothiazide, was marketed under the trade name Diuril beginning in 1958. In most countries, thiazides are the least expensive antihypertensive drugs available.

Thiazide organic molecules are bi-cyclic structures that contain adjacent sulfur and nitrogen atoms on one ring. Confusion sometimes occurs because thiazide-like diuretics such as indapamide are referred to as thiazides despite not having the thiazide chemical structure. When used this way, "thiazide" refers to a drug which acts at the thiazide receptor. The thiazide receptor is a sodium-chloride transporter that pulls NaCl from the lumen in the distal convoluted tubule. Thiazide diuretics inhibit this receptor, causing the body to release NaCl and water into the lumen, thereby increasing the amount of urine produced each day. An example of a molecule that is chemically a thiazide but not used as a diuretic is methylchloroisothiazolinone, often found as an antimicrobial in cosmetics.

Medical uses
Thiazide diuretics are primarily used to treat the hypertension (high blood pressure) and edema (swelling) caused by water overload as well as certain conditions related to unbalanced calcium metabolism.

Water balance

Hypertension
There are many causes of hypertension (high blood pressure), including advancing age, smoking and obesity. Sometimes the underlying cause of hypertension can not be determined, resulting in a diagnosis of idiopathic hypertension. Regardless of the cause, someone may have very high hypertension without any initial symptoms. Uncontrolled hypertension will eventually cause damage to the heart, kidneys and eyes. Lifestyle changes, including reducing dietary salt, increasing exercise and losing weight can help to reduce blood pressure.

Thiazides and thiazide-like diuretics have been in constant use since their introduction in 1958. Decades as a cornerstone of hypertension treatment show how well these drugs perform for most patients. Low-dose thiazides are tolerated as well as the other classes of medications for hypertension, including ACE inhibitors, beta blockers and  calcium channel blockers. In general, the thiazides and thiazide-like diuretics reduce the risk of death, stroke, heart attack, and heart failure due to hypertension.

Clinical practice guidelines regarding the use of thiazides vary by geographic region. Guidelines in the United States recommend thiazides as a first-line treatment for hypertension (JNC VIII). A systematic review by the Cochrane Collaboration specifically recommended that low-dose thiazides be used as the initial pharmacological therapy for high blood pressure. Low-dose thiazides are more effective at treating hypertension than beta blockers and are similar to angiotensin-converting enzyme (ACE) inhibitors.  Thiazides are a recommended treatment for hypertension in Europe (ESC/ESH). However, the UK National Institute for Health and Clinical Excellence recommends ACE inhibitor and calcium channel blockers for first-line treatment of hypertension in adults (CG127). Thiazides should be considered as initial treatment if the patient has a high risk of developing heart failure.  Thiazides have also been replaced by ACE inhibitors in Australia due to the association between thaizide use and increased risk of developing diabetes mellitus type 2.

Diabetes insipidus 
Thiazides can be used to paradoxically decrease urine flow in people with nephrogenic diabetes insipidus. Thiazides may also be useful in treating hyponatremia (low blood sodium) in infants with central diabetes insipidus.

Calcium balance

Urinary stones 
Thiazides are useful in treating kidney stones and bladder stones that result from hypercalciuria (high urine calcium levels). Thiazides increase the uptake of calcium in the distal tubules, to moderately reduce urinary calcium. Thiazides combined with potassium citrate, increased water intake and decreased dietary oxalate and sodium can slow or even reverse the formation of calcium-containing kidney stones. High-dose therapy with the thiazide-like diuretic indapamide can be used to treat idiopathic hypercalcinuria (high urine calcium with unknown cause).

Dent's disease 
Thiazides may be used to treat the symptoms of Dent's disease, an X-linked genetic condition that results in electrolyte imbalance with repeated episodes of kidney stones. A case study of two brothers with the condition, two years of treatment with hydrochlorothiazide reduced the incidence of kidney stones and improved kidney function.  The thiazide-like diuretic chlortalidone reduced urine calcium oxalate in seven of the eight males with inactivated CLCN5 gene that participated in the study. Inactivation of the CLCN5 gene causes Dent's disease Type 1. The rare nature of Dent's disease makes it difficult to coordinate large controlled studies, so most evidence for thiazide use is with too few patients to make broad recommendations possible. Long-term thiazide use may not be advisable due to the risk of significant adverse side effects.

Osteoporosis 
Hypocalcemia (low blood calcium) can be caused by a variety of conditions that reduce dietary calcium absorption, increase calcium excretion or both. Positive calcium balance occurs when calcium excretion is decreased and intake remains constant so that calcium is retained within the body. Higher levels of retained calcium are associated with increased bone mineral density and fewer fractures in individuals with osteoporosis.  By a poorly understood mechanism, thiazides directly stimulate osteoblast differentiation and bone mineral formation, further slowing the course of osteoporosis.

Other uses 
Bromine intoxication can be treated by giving intravenous saline with either thiazides or Loop diuretics.

Contraindications
Contraindications include: 
 Hypotension
 Allergy to sulphur-containing medications
 Gout
 Kidney failure
 Lithium therapy
 Hypokalemia
 May worsen diabetes

Thiazides reduce the clearance of uric acid since they compete for the same transporter, and therefore raise the levels of uric acid in the blood.  Hence, they are prescribed with caution in patients with gout or hyperuricemia.

Chronic administration of thiazides is associated with the increase of insulin resistance which can lead to hyperglycemia.

Thiazides  cause loss of blood potassium, while conserving blood calcium.

Thiazides can decrease placental perfusion and adversely affect the fetus, so should be avoided in pregnancy.

Adverse effects
  Hypokalemia – Thiazide diuretics reduce potassium concentration in blood through two indirect mechanisms: inhibition of sodium-chloride symporter at distal convoluted tubule of a nephron and stimulation of aldosterone that activates Na+/K+-ATPase at collecting duct. Inhibition of sodium-chloride symporter increases availability of sodium and chloride in urine. When the urine reaches the collecting duct, the increase in sodium and chloride availability activates Na+/K+-ATPase, which increases the absorption of sodium and excretion of potassium into the urine. Long term administration of thiazide diuretics reduces total body blood volume. This activates the renin–angiotensin system, stimulates the secretion of aldosterone, thus activating Na+/K+-ATPase, increasing excretion of potassium in urine. Therefore, ACE inhibitor and thiazide combination is used to prevent hypokalemia.
 Hyperglycemia
 Hyperlipidemia
 Hyperuricemia 
 Hypercalcemia
 Hyponatremia
 Hypomagnesemia
 Hypocalciuria

Mechanism of action

Thiazide diuretics control hypertension in part by inhibiting reabsorption of sodium (Na+) and chloride (Cl−) ions from the distal convoluted tubules in the kidneys by blocking the thiazide-sensitive Na+-Cl− symporter.   The term "thiazide" is also often used for drugs with a similar action that do not have the thiazide chemical structure, such as chlorthalidone and metolazone. These agents are more properly termed thiazide-like diuretics.

Thiazide diuretics also increase calcium reabsorption at the distal tubule. By lowering the sodium concentration in the tubule epithelial cells, thiazides indirectly increase the activity of the basolateral Na+/Ca2+ antiporter to maintain intracellular Na+ level, facilitating Ca2+ to leave the epithelial cells into the renal interstitium. Thus, intracellular Ca2+ concentration is decreased, which allows more Ca2+ from the lumen of the tubules to enter epithelial cells via apical Ca2+-selective channels (TRPV5). In other words, less Ca2+ in the cell increases the driving force for reabsorption from the lumen.

Thiazides are also thought to increase the reabsorption of Ca2+ by a mechanism involving the reabsorption of sodium and calcium in the proximal tubule in response to sodium depletion. Some of this response is due to augmentation of the action of parathyroid hormone.

Breastfeeding
Thiazides pass into breast milk and can decrease the flow of breast milk. Thiazides have been associated with significant side effects in some nursing infants and should be administered to nursing mothers with caution.

History
The thiazide diuretics were developed by scientists Karl H. Beyer, James M. Sprague, John E. Baer, and Frederick C. Novello of Merck and Co. in the 1950s, and led to the marketing of the first drug of this class, chlorothiazide, under the trade name Diuril in 1958.  The research leading to the discovery of chlorothiazide, leading to "the saving of untold thousands of lives and the alleviation of the suffering of millions of victims of hypertension" was recognized by a special Public Health Award from the Lasker Foundation in 1975.

References

World Anti-Doping Agency prohibited substances
Nephrotoxins